Nandi Awards presented annually by Government of Andhra Pradesh. First awarded in 1964.

1997 Nandi Awards Winners List

References 

Nandi Awards
1997 Indian film awards